Bryar is a surname. Notable people with the surname include:

Bob Bryar (born 1979), American musician and sound engineer
Claudia Bryar (1918–2011), American actress, wife of Paul
Dick Bryar (1925–1968), Australian rules footballer
Paul Bryar (1910–1985), American actor

See also
Bryan (surname)